Murod Zukhurov is an Uzbekistani retired goalkeeper. He was born on 23 February 1983 in Tashkent.

Zukhurov played for Bunyodkor in the 2009 AFC Champions League group stage.

Career statistics

Club

International

Statistics accurate as of match played 10 September 2013

References

1983 births
Living people
Uzbekistani footballers
Navbahor Namangan players
FC Nasaf players
FC Bunyodkor players
2011 AFC Asian Cup players
Association football goalkeepers
Uzbekistan Super League players
AFC Cup winning players
Uzbekistan international footballers